The year 1813 in science and technology involved some significant events, listed below.

Biology
 April – William Charles Wells reads a paper to the Royal Society of London making the first clear statement about natural selection.
 Charles Waterton begins the process of turning his estate at Walton Hall, West Yorkshire, England, into what is, in effect, the world's first nature reserve.

Chemistry
 Mathieu Orfila publishes his groundbreaking Traité des poisons, formalizing the field of toxicology.
 Louis Jacques Thénard commences publication of his textbook Traité de chimie élémentaire, théorique et pratique in Paris.
 Edward Howard invents the enclosed vacuum pan for refining sugar.

Exploration
 May 11 – Gregory Blaxland, William Lawson and William Wentworth leave on an expedition to cross the Blue Mountains (New South Wales).

Mathematics
 S. D. Poisson publishes Poisson's equation, his correction of Laplace's second order partial differential equation for potential.

Physics
 British engineer Peter Ewart supports the idea of the conservation of energy in his paper "On the measure of moving force".

Sociology
 Henri de Saint-Simon publishes Physiologie sociale.

Technology
 Probable date – George E. Clymer invents the Columbian press.

Institutions
 March 1 – Sir Humphry Davy employs Michael Faraday as "chemical assistant" at the Royal Institution of Great Britain in London.

Awards
 Copley Medal: William Thomas Brande

Births
 January 19 – Henry Bessemer, English inventor (died 1898)
 February 18 – Karl Weltzien, Russian-born German inorganic chemist, an organizer of the Karlsruhe Congress (died 1870)
 March 19 – David Livingstone, Scottish missionary and explorer (died 1873)
 April 16 - Justin Benoît, French surgeon and anatomist (died 1893)
 July 12 – Claude Bernard, French physiologist (died 1878)
 October 17 – Georg Büchner, Hessian-born writer and anatomist (died 1837)
 December 19 – Thomas Andrews, Irish chemist (died 1885)
 December 29 – Alexander Parkes, English chemist (died 1890)

Deaths
 April 10 – Joseph Louis Lagrange, Piedmont-born mathematician (born 1736)
 April 19 – Benjamin Rush, Founding Father of the United States, chemist and physician (born 1746)
 April 27 – General Zebulon Pike, American explorer (born 1779)
 May – Johann Karl Wilhelm Illiger, German zoologist (born 1775)
 July 22 – George Shaw, English naturalist (born 1751)
 August 23 – Alexander Wilson, Scottish American ornithologist (born 1766)

References

 
19th century in science
1810s in science